Mario Asselin is a Canadian politician, who was elected to the National Assembly of Quebec in the 2018 provincial election. He represents the electoral district of Vanier-Les Rivières as a member of the Coalition Avenir Québec.

Electoral Record

References

Living people
Coalition Avenir Québec MNAs
21st-century Canadian politicians
Politicians from Quebec City
Year of birth missing (living people)
Université Laval alumni